The State Highway 19 Bridge at Trinity River, near Riverside, Texas, brings State Highway 19 across the Trinity River between Trinity County, Texas and Walker County, Texas.  It was built in 1940.  It was listed on the National Register of Historic Places in 2004.

It is a Parker through truss bridge designed by the Texas Highway Department and was built by P & B Construction.

References

External links

		
National Register of Historic Places in Trinity County, Texas
National Register of Historic Places in Walker County, Texas
Infrastructure completed in 1940